As authorized by the 1990 farm bill (P.L. 101-624), the Alternative Agricultural Research and Commercialization Corporation (AARCC) was originally established as the Applied Agricultural Research Commercialization Center in the USDA to be a public venture capital agency that would invest in small businesses to help them develop and commercialize new nonfood products from agricultural and forestry commodities.  The 1996 farm bill (P.L. 104-127) changed the Center from a government agency to a wholly owned venture capital corporation of USDA.  Congress repealed the authority for AARCC in the 
2002 farm bill (P.L. 107-171, Sec. 6201).

References 

United States Department of Agriculture agencies
United States Department of Agriculture programs